Rapid City is an unincorporated community and census-designated place (CDP) in Kalkaska County in the U.S. state of Michigan. At the 2020 census, the CDP had a population of 1,357.

History
A post office first opened in the area as Van Buren on November 22, 1892.  The post office was renamed to Vanburen on January 18, 1895, and finally to Rapid City on April 30, 1898. The town is named after the Rapid River, which flows through it.

The community of Rapid City was listed as a newly organized census-designated place for the 2010 census, meaning it now has officially defined boundaries and population statistics for the first time.  The CDP is organized for statistical purposes only and has no legal status as an incorporated municipality.

Geography

The community is located on the Rapid River, and is immediately adjacent Torch Lake. Rapid River is located on the Antrim County line.

Demographics

References

Unincorporated communities in Kalkaska County, Michigan
Unincorporated communities in Michigan
Census-designated places in Kalkaska County, Michigan
Census-designated places in Michigan
Traverse City micropolitan area